Derek Llewellyn-Jones  (29 April 1923 – 28 November 1997) was an Australian gynaecologist and author. He was an Associate Professor of Obstetrics and Gynaecology at the University of Sydney for 23 years. He wrote Everywoman, the textbook Fundamentals of Obstetrics and Gynaecology, Everyman and Everygirl.

References

External links
Worldcat listing for Derek Llewellyn-Jones

 

20th-century Australian male writers
1923 births
1997 deaths
Australian gynaecologists
20th-century Australian non-fiction writers
Welsh emigrants to Australia